Ernest Albert Buttenshaw (23 May 187626 June 1950) was an Australian politician and member of the New South Wales Legislative Assembly from 1917 until 1932. He was a member of the Nationalist Party of Australia until 1920, when he helped to establish the Progressive Party. After 1925 he was a member of its successor, the Country Party. He was the party leader between 1925 and 1932 and held a number of government ministries.

Buttenshaw was born in Young, New South Wales. His father, was a blacksmith and he was educated to elementary level at Young Superior School. He initially worked as a delivery boy for the Post Office and later became a farmer. He was active in farmer's political groups and was the Shire President of Bland Shire in 1914-1918.

Buttenshaw was elected as the Nationalist member for Lachlan at the 1917 NSW state election. With the introduction of proportional representation in multi-member seats he became the member for Murrumbidgee between 1920 and 1927. When single member electorates were restored in 1927, he again became the member for Lachlan until his retirement in 1938. With Michael Bruxner he was one of the 'true blue' progressives who refused to support a coalition government with George Fuller's Nationalists. Bruxner's faction became the Country Party with Bruxner as the leader and Buttenshaw the deputy leader. Bruxner resigned the leadership for family reasons in late 1925 and was succeeded by Buttenshaw. After the 1927 election of the Nationalist/Country coalition government led by Thomas Bavin, Buttenshaw became the Minister for Railways (1927–1929) and Secretary for Public Works (1927–1930). He was the Acting Premier while Bavin was on a loan raising trip to the United Kingdom between April and August 1929. In 1932, Buttenshaw stood down in favour of Bruxner and became deputy leader again. He held the position of Secretary for Lands in the government of Bertram Stevens.

He was a keen tennis player and coached Harry Hopman.

References

 

 

1875 births
1950 deaths
Members of the New South Wales Legislative Assembly
National Party of Australia members of the Parliament of New South Wales
People from Young, New South Wales